It's a Wiggly Wiggly World is the tenth album by Australian band The Wiggles, released in 2000 by ABC Music distributed by EMI. It was nominated for the 2000 ARIA Music Award for Best Children's Album but lost to Hi-5's Jump and Jive with Hi-5.

Track listing

Personnel
The Wiggles
Murray Cook – guitar, bass, backing vocals
Jeff Fatt – backing vocals
Anthony Field – backing vocals
Greg Page – lead and backing vocals

Additional musicians
Terry Murray – guitar
John O'Grady – double bass
Tony Henry – drums
Maria Schattovits – violin
Margaret Lindsay – cello
Dominic Lindsay – trumpet
Mark Punch – backing vocals
Rick Price – backing vocals
Paul Field – backing vocals
Paul Paddick – backing vocals

Charts

Certifications

Video

It's a Wiggly Wiggly World is a video released by Australian children's band the Wiggles in July 2000.

Song List
 "In the Wiggles World"
 "Here Comes the Wiggles"
 "In the Big Red Car We Like To Ride"
 "I Love To Have A Dance With Dorothy (featuring Slim Dusty)"
 "Taba Naba (featuring Christine Anu)"
 "Tie Me Kangaroo Down, Sport (featuring Rolf Harris)"
 "Sing With Me (featuring Kamahl)"
 "Hey Hey Hey We're all Pirate Dancing"
 "Another Cuppa"
 "Starry Night"
 "Six Months in a Leaky Boat (featuring Tim Finn)"
 "One Little Coyote"
 "Blow Me Down"
 "Let's Go (We're Riding in the Big Red Car)"
 "Morningtown Ride (featuring Jimmy Little)"
 "Haru Ga Kita (featuring Atsuko Arai)"

Releases

VHS
 Australia: 25 July 2000 
 United States: 22 January 2002

DVD
 United States:  1 March 2005
 Australia: 14 June 2005

Other
In 2020, the video was released in multiple segments on their YouTube channel. The sections pertaining to Rolf Harris were removed.

Cast
The Wiggles
 Murray Cook
 Jeff Fatt
 Anthony Field
 Greg Page

Cast
 Leeanne Ashley as Dorothy the Dinosaur
 Paul Paddick as Captain Feathersword
 Cameron Lewis as Wags the Dog
 Reem Hanwell as Henry the Octopus
 Leanne Halloran as Officer Beaples

Notes

References

External links

2000 video albums
2000 albums
The Wiggles videos
The Wiggles albums
Australian children's musical films